Tyrone Vi'iga (born 9 June 1992) is an Australian professional rugby footballer of Cook Islands & Samoan heritage. He plays for AS Béziers Hérault. He previously played for the NSW Country Eagles, and Sydney RAMS and also represented the Cook Islands at the 2013 Rugby League World Cup. He has played both 'codes' but is currently a Rugby Union professional.

Career

Rugby league
He was a member of the Cronulla-Sutherland Sharks Under 20's side in 2012, before joining the Wentworthville Magpies in the NSW Cup competition.

Rugby union
Vi'iga switched to rugby union to play in the Shute Shield competition as a backrower with the Penrith club in 2014 and then Eastern Suburbs in 2015. He was signed by the New South Wales Country Eagles team for the 2015 National Rugby Championship. Joined Two Blue (Parramatta) 2016, Western Sydney Rams NRC 2016

References

External links
 It's rugby stats

1992 births
Australian rugby league players
Australian sportspeople of Samoan descent
Australian people of Cook Island descent
Cook Islands national rugby league team players
Rugby league props
Sportsmen from New South Wales
Living people
Rugby league players from Sydney
AS Béziers Hérault players
Provence Rugby players
Australian expatriate sportspeople in France
Australian expatriate rugby union players
Expatriate rugby union players in France